Conduit is the debut studio album by British musician Coby Sey. It was released through AD 93 on 9 September 2022. The album features Sey on vocals, multiple instruments and production, with instrumental contributions from Ben Vince, Biu Rainey and Good Sad Happy Bad members Raisa Miriam Khan and CJ Calderwood. The album was supported by singles "Permeated Secrets" and "Onus".

Accolades

Semester-end lists

Year-end lists

Track listing

Personnel
Credits adapted from liner notes of Conduit.

 Coby Sey – primary artist, production, instrumentation, vocals, electronics, electric bass, drums, keyboards, percussion, artwork, art direction, photography, photography direction, mixing, engineering
 CJ Calderwood – featured artist, alto saxophone 
 Raisa Miriam Khan – featured artist, electronic percussion 
 Biu Rainey – featured artist, electric guitar 
 Ben Vince – featured artist,  tenor saxophone 
 Ksenia Burnasheva – photography, photography direction
 Tasker – art direction 
 Nicola Tirabasso – art direction
 Kassian Troyer – mastering

Release history

References

External links
 

2022 debut albums
Coby Sey albums
AD 93 albums
